The 1970 Georgia 500 was a NASCAR Grand National Series event that was held on November 8, 1970, at Middle Georgia Raceway in Byron, Georgia.

NASCAR officials would record four engine-related incidents, one major fire, two issues related to the vehicle's suspension and an oil leak.

Race report
The race car drivers still had to commute to the races using the same stock cars that competed in a typical weekend's race through a policy of homologation (and under their own power). This policy was in effect until roughly 1975. By 1980, NASCAR had completely stopped tracking the year model of all the vehicles and most teams did not take stock cars to the track under their own power anymore.

The race took three hours, thirteen minutes, and thirty-three seconds to reach its conclusion; Richard Petty (racing for Petty Enterprises) defeated Bobby Isaac in fourteen seconds. Total winnings for this race were $20,000 ($ when considering inflation) with the winner receiving most of $3,275 ($ when considering inflation). This event would be the first of two career starts for Jimmy Watson. Notable crew chiefs for this race included Harry Hyde, Dale Inman and Lee Gordon.

Petty's wins in 1970 came at 18 different tracks. He didn't have any sweeps.

This would be the final career start for Lee Roy Carrigg; whose NASCAR Winston Cup Series race spanned nine races and 1002 laps of racing action.

Earlier that year, the second annual Atlanta International Pop Festival was held in the same venue as this racing event. Jimi Hendrix and the Allman Brothers Band performed in front of 300,000 concertgoers; the town had a population of about 2,000.

In comparison to this summer musical festival that took place from July 3–5, this autumn racing event only attracted 6500 people in order to see stock car vehicles travel at speeds averaging  throughout the entire event.

Qualifying

Finishing order
Section reference: 

 Richard Petty (No. 43)
 Bobby Isaac† (No. 71)
 Dick Brooks† (No. 32)
 Bobby Allison (No. 22)
 John Sears† (No. 4)
 James Hylton† (No. 48)
 Benny Parsons† (No. 72)
 Elmo Langley† (No. 64)
 Jabe Thomas (No. 25)
 Cecil Gordon† (No. 24)
 Neil Castles (No. 06)
 Ben Arnold (No. 76)
 Bill Champion† (No. 10)
 Jimmy Watson (No. 16)
 Friday Hassler† (No. 39)
 Henley Gray (No. 19)
 Bill Shirey (No. 74)
 Roy Mayne*† (No. 77)
 Jim Vandiver* (No. 58)
 Morgan Shepherd* (No. 93)
 Wendell Scott*† (No. 34)
 Joe Frasson*† (No. 8)
 Lee Roy Carrigg* (No. 87)
 Dave Marcis* (No. 26)
 Bill Dennis* (No. 54)
 Rod Eulenfield* (No. 89)
 Frank Warren* (No. 79)
 E.J. Trivette* (No. 02)
 Dick May*† (No. 67)
 Larry Baumel* (No. 68)

* Driver failed to finish race
† signifies that the driver is known to be deceased

Timeline
Section reference: 
 Start: Richard Petty was leading the starting grid as the green flag was waved.
 Lap 4: Larry Baumel's vehicle developed engine problems.
 Lap 37: Dick Brooks took over the lead from Richard Petty.
 Lap 54: Dick May's vehicle developed problems with its suspension.
 Lap 68: E.J. Trivette managed to lose the rear end of his vehicle.
 Lap 78: Frank Warren's vehicle developed problems with its suspension.
 Lap 80: Rod Eulenfeld's vehicle caught on fire due to the high speeds.
 Lap 85: Richard Petty took over the lead from Dick Brooks.
 Lap 86: Dick Brooks took over the lead from Richard Petty.
 Lap 105: Bill Dennis' vehicle developed problems with its ignition.
 Lap 131: Dave Marcis' vehicle developed engine problems.
 Lap 139: Bobby Isaac took over the lead from Dick Brooks.
 Lap 141: Dick Brooks took over the lead from Bobby Isaac.
 Lap 173: Bobby Allison took over the lead from Dick Brooks.
 Lap 181: Lee Roy Carrig's vehicle developed engine problems.
 Lap 201: Bobby Isaac took over the lead from Bobby Allison.
 Lap 223: Oil started leaking out of Joe Frasson's vehicle; knocking him out the race.
 Lap 265: Wendell Scott's vehicle developed engine problems.
 Lap 285: Jim Vandiver managed to lose the rear end of his vehicle.
 Lap 404: Richard Petty took over the lead from Bobby Isaac.
 Lap 405: Roy Mayne's vehicle developed engine problems.
 Lap 411: Bobby Isaac took over the lead from Richard Petty.
 Lap 413: Richard Petty took over the lead from Bobby Isaac.
 Lap 426: Bobby Isaac took over the lead from Richard Petty.
 Lap 445: Richard Petty took over the lead from Bobby Isaac.
 Finish: Richard Petty was officially declared the winner of the race.

References

Georgia 500
Georgia 500
NASCAR races at Middle Georgia Raceway